Bugulchan (Bögölsän) is a rural locality (a selo) and the administrative centre of Leninsky Selsoviet, Kuyurgazinsky District, Bashkortostan, Russia. The population was 582 as of 2010. There are 11 streets.

Geography 
Bugulchan is located 25 km northeast of Yermolayevo (the district's administrative centre) by road. Pchelka is the nearest rural locality.

References 

Rural localities in Kuyurgazinsky District